Star Shadow is a stealthy flying wing unmanned combat aerial vehicle developed by the Chinese company Star UAV System. It will have a maximum take-off weight (MTOW) of 4,000 kg with a truncated diamond-shaped airframe 7.3 m long, with sweptback outer wings that have a total span of 15 m. It is powered by TWS800 small turbofan engines. Endurance is 12 hours and the ceiling is 15,000 m.

See also

References

Unmanned stealth aircraft
Unmanned military aircraft of China